Cyclooctadiene iridium methoxide dimer is an organoiridium compound with the formula Ir2(OCH3)2(C8H12)2, where C8H12 is the diene 1,5-cyclooctadiene. It is a yellow solid that is soluble in organic solvents. The complex is used as a precursor to other iridium complexes, some of which are used in homogeneous catalysis. 

The compound is prepared by treating cyclooctadiene iridium chloride dimer with sodium methoxide. In terms of its molecular structure, the iridium centers are square planar as is typical for a d8 complex.  The Ir2O2 core is folded.

References

Homogeneous catalysis
Cyclooctadiene complexes
Organoiridium compounds